The Fifteenth Amendment to the Constitution of Bangladesh was passed on 30 June 2011. This amendment made some significant changes to the constitution:

Amendments 
 Incorporated four original fundamental state policies of the 1972 constitution nationalism, socialism, democracy and secularism. 
 Increased number of women reserved seats to 50 from existing 45.
 After article 7 it inserted articles 7(a) and 7(b) in a bid to end take over of power through extra-constitutional means. Section 7(b) declared the basic provisions of the constitution "non-amendable".
 Added provision for the protection and improvement of the environment and biodiversity.
 Added provision for protecting the culture of tribes, ethnic communities, and minor races .
 Abolished the caretaker government system which was incorporated through 13th amendment to the constitution in 1996 but later ruled out by the Supreme Court of Bangladesh.
 Acknowledged Sheikh Mujibur Rahman as the Father of the Nation. 
 Abolished referendum system from the constitution.
 Participation in election declared illegal for those who have been convicted of crimes against humanity during 1971 liberation war.
 State of emergency can not be continued for more than 120 days.
 Inserted three new schedules at the end of the constitution which are 7 March Speech of Sheikh Mujibur Rahman, Declaration of Independence by Sheikh Mujibur Rahman on 25 March 1971 midnight, and Proclamation of Independence by the Mujibnagar Government on 10 April 1971.

References 

Amendments to the Constitution of Bangladesh
Constitution of Bangladesh